Kenshin Ōshima (Japanese 大島健伸) is a Japanese billionaire and founder of finance company SFCG Co.

Biography
Ōshima is a graduate of Keio University. He serves as president of SFCG Co. which lends to small-to-medium size firms. It was known for its aggressive debt collection techniques. He is married and has two children. His daughter, Yuki Oshima-Wilpon, was married to Bruce Wilpon, son of Fred Wilpon, the owner of the New York Mets; she is remarried to Nicky Scott, close friend of Prince Harry.

As of 2006, his net worth was listed at $1.2 billion.

References

1948 births
Living people
Japanese billionaires
Japanese company founders
Keio University alumni